Jacobinense Esporte Clube, commonly known as Jacobinense, is a Brazilian football club based in Jacobina, Bahia state. The club was formerly known as Pituaçu Futebol Clube Cajazeiras.

History
Founded on 4 November 2015 as Pituaçu Futebol Clube Cajazeiras in Salvador, the club played their first professional competition in the 2016 Copa Governador do Estado da Bahia. After finishing in the second position for two consecutive Campeonato Baiano Second Division editions (2017 and 2018), the club finished fourth in 2019 and did not play in the 2020 edition.

On 5 November 2021, PFC Cajazeiras' register was changed to Jacobinense Esporte Clube, as the club moved to Jacobina. After starting in the 2022 Second Division, the club finished second and achieved a first-ever promotion to the Campeonato Baiano.

References

Football clubs in Bahia
Association football clubs established in 2015
2015 establishments in Brazil